Crazy People is a 1934 British comedy film directed by Leslie S. Hiscott and starring Henry Kendall, Nancy O'Neil and Kenneth Kove. It was made at Beaconsfield Studios as a quota quickie. It was based on the novel Safety First by Margot Neville.

Cast
 Henry Kendall as Hippo Rayne  
 Nancy O'Neil as Nanda Macdonald  
 Kenneth Kove as Birdie Nightingale  
 Helen Haye as Aunt Caroline  
 Vera Bogetti 
 Wally Patch 
 Hal Walters 
 Hugh E. Wright

See also
 Safety First (1926)

References

Bibliography
 Low, Rachael. Filmmaking in 1930s Britain. George Allen & Unwin, 1985.
 Goble, Alan. The Complete Index to Literary Sources in Film. Walter de Gruyter, 2011. 
 Wood, Linda. British Films, 1927-1939. British Film Institute, 1986.

External links

1934 films
British comedy films
1934 comedy films
1930s English-language films
Films shot at Beaconsfield Studios
Films directed by Leslie S. Hiscott
Quota quickies
Films based on Australian novels
Remakes of British films
Sound film remakes of silent films
British black-and-white films
1930s British films